Burke County is a county located in the U.S. state of North Carolina. As of the 2020 census, its population was 87,570. Its county seat is Morganton. Burke County is part of the Hickory–Lenoir–Morganton, NC metropolitan statistical area.

History
Indigenous peoples inhabited the interior and the coastal areas for thousands of years. Native Americans of the complex and far-flung Mississippian culture inhabited the county long before Europeans arrived in the New World. They were part of a trade network extending from the Gulf Coast to the Great Lakes. They built earthwork mounds, including at Joara, a  site and regional chiefdom in North Carolina. (Present-day Morganton developed near this site.) It was the center of the largest Native American settlement in North Carolina, dating from about 1000 AD and expanding into the next centuries.

In 1567, Spanish Juan Pardo's expedition arrived and built Fort San Juan at Joara, claiming the area for the colony of Spanish Florida. Pardo named the settlement Cuenca, after his home city. They had been sent by the governor at Santa Elena (Parris Island) in South Carolina to find an overland route to the silver mines in central Mexico, believing that the Appalachians were connected to a range there.

Captain Juan Pardo, leader of the expedition, left about 30 soldiers at the fort while continuing his exploration. His expedition built another five forts to the west, in the foothills of the mountains. In the spring of 1568, the Indians attacked Fort San Juan, killing the soldiers and burning the fort. The natives killed all soldiers except one at the garrisons, at five other Spanish forts in the interior.

In 1777, during the American Revolutionary War, Burke County was formed from Rowan County. It was named for Thomas Burke, then serving as a delegate to the Continental Congress (1777 to 1781). He was later elected as governor of North Carolina, serving one term from 1781 to 1782. The western Piedmont was settled by many Scots-Irish and German immigrants in the mid- to late 18th century.  They were generally yeoman farmers and fiercely independent.

As population increased, the county was divided to form other jurisdictions.  In 1791, parts of Burke County and Rutherford County were combined to form Buncombe County.  In 1833, parts of Burke and Buncombe Counties were combined to form Yancey County.  In 1841, parts of Burke and Wilkes Counties were combined to form Caldwell County.  In 1842, additional parts of Burke and Rutherford Counties were combined to form McDowell County. Finally, in 1861, parts of Burke, Caldwell, McDowell, Watauga, and Yancey Counties were combined to form Mitchell County.

The Burke County Regiment participated in the Battle of Kings Mountain, which pitted Appalachian frontiersmen against the Loyalist forces of British commander Ferguson at Kings Mountain, SC, in the American Revolution. Rather than waiting for Ferguson to invade their territory, militiamen throughout the Blue Ridge who crossed over the mountains to meet the enemy were known as the Over Mountain Men.

A record of the 1567 Spanish expedition was not discovered and translated into English until the late 20th century. In the 1990s, excavation was started at a site believed to be Joara, continuing into the 21st century. In 2013, archeologists announced that they had found remains of Fort San Juan at Joara, confirming early accounts. This has changed knowledge and interpretation of early European encounters and colonization efforts in what would become the United States, as Spanish efforts preceded the successful efforts of England in Jamestown, Virginia, by 40 years.

Geography

The county contains portions of two lakes: Lake James along its western border with McDowell County and Lake Rhodhiss along its northeastern border with Caldwell County.

Table Rock, a prominent peak in the county in the east rim of Linville Gorge, part of Pisgah National Forest, has been described as "the most visible symbol in the region".

In the southern part of the county, the South Mountains State Park covers almost 21,000 acres and features waterfalls and hiking trails.

National protected areas
 Blue Ridge Parkway (part)
 Linville Gorge Wilderness (part)
 Pisgah National Forest (part)

State and local protected areas 
 Lake James State Park (part)
 South Mountains Game Lands (part)
 South Mountains State Park

Major water bodies 
 Canoe Creek
 Catawba River
 Dales Creek
 Drowning Creek
 Hall Creek
 Henry Fork (South Fork Catawba River tributary)
 Irish Creek
 Jacob Fork (South Fork Catawba River tributary)
 Lake James
 Linville River
 Little River
 Old Catawba River
 Pearcey Creek
 Rhodhiss Lake
 Rock Creek
 Roses Creek
 Silver Creek
 Upper Creek

Adjacent counties
 Avery County - northwest
 Caldwell County - north
 Catawba County - east
 Cleveland County - south
 Rutherford County - south
 McDowell County - west

Major highways

Major infrastructure 
 Foothills Regional Airport (partially in Caldwell County)
 Hickory Regional Airport (partially in Catawba County)

Demographics

2020 census

As of the 2020 United States census,  87,570 people, 36,634 households, and 25,391 families resided in the county.

2000 census
As of the census of 2000,  89,148 people, 34,528 households, and 24,342 families were residing in the county.  The population density was 176 people per square mile (68/km2).  The 37,427 housing units had an average density of 74 per square mile (29/km2).  The racial makeup of the county was 86.01% White, 6.71% African American, 0.30% Native American, 3.48% Asian, 0.21% Pacific Islander, 2.17% from other races, and 1.11% from two or more races. About 3.57% of the population were Hispanics or Latinos of any race.

Of the 34,528 households, 31.0% had children under 18 living with them, 54.9% were married couples living together, 11.0% had a female householder with no husband present, and 29.5% were not families. About 25.5% of all households were made up of individuals, and 9.9% had someone living alone who was 65 or older.  The average household size was 2.48, and the average family size was 2.94.

In the county, the age distribution was 24.0% under 18, 8.90% from 18 to 24, 29.6% from 25 to 44, 24.0% from 45 to 64, and 13.4% who were 65 or older.  The median age was 37 years. For every 100 females, there were 100.00 males.  For every 100 females 18 and over, there were 97.70 males.

The median income for a household in the county was $35,629, and for a family was $42,114. Males had a median income of $27,591 versus $21,993 for females. The per capita income for the county was $17,397.  About 8.00% of families and 10.70% of the population were below the poverty line, including 13.6% of those under 18 and 12.5% of those 65 or over.

Government and politics
Burke County leans heavily Republican in presidential elections. The last Democrat to carry the county was Jimmy Carter in 1976. Lyndon Johnson, who won the county as a Democrat in 1964, was the only other one to do so since World War II. However, as late as the 1990s, Democratic presidential candidates have managed to garner 40% of the county's vote. As was typical for all of the South outside the Appalachian highlands and a few stronghold Republican counties, Burke County was mostly solidly Democratic before WWII.

In the North Carolina Senate, Burke County lies within the 46th Senate district, which also covers Cleveland County and is represented by RepublicanWarren Daniel. In the North Carolina House of Representatives, the northern two-thirds of Burke County comprises the 86th District represented by Republican Hugh Blackwell. The southern third lies within the 112nd district, which also covers Rutherford County and is represented by Republican David Rogers.

Burke County is a member of the regional Western Piedmont Council of Governments. The county is governed by a five-member Board of Commissioners, elected to serve four-year terms.

Communities

City
 Morganton (county seat and largest city)

Towns

 Connelly Springs
 Drexel
 Glen Alpine
 Hildebran
 Long View
 Rhodhiss
 Rutherford College
 Valdese

Townships

 Drexel
 Icard
 Jonas Ridge
 Linville
 Lovelady
 Lower Creek
 Lower Fork
 Quaker Meadows
 Silver Creek
 Smoky Creek
 Upper Creek
 Upper Fork
 Hildebran
 Connelly Springs
 Rutherford College
 Valdese

Census-designated places
 Icard
 Salem

Unincorporated communities
 Jonas Ridge
 Linville Falls
 Petersburg

In popular culture
Although never explicitly mentioned by name in the novel, the hideout of Robur-the villain in Jules Verne's Master of the World-is thought to be Table Rock Mountain in Burke County.

Many scenes from the 1992 film Last of the Mohicans were filmed in Burke County. A full-scale fort was built next to the Linville boat access on Lake James for the filming. The fort was later destroyed and the land replanted with trees. Many of the extras who played settlers, British soldiers, and Native Americans were locals from Burke and surrounding counties.

The final scene from The Hunt for Red October had the backdrop filmed on Lake James, while the actors stayed in Hollywood.

In 2011, scenes for the Lionsgate adaptation of The Hunger Games were filmed near Hildebran, North Carolina, at the Henry River Mill Village.

See also
 List of counties in North Carolina
 National Register of Historic Places listings in Burke County, North Carolina
 Burke County Regiment of the Salisbury District Brigade
 North Carolina State Parks
 National Park Service
 List of national forests of the United States

References

External links

 

 
Counties of Appalachia
Western North Carolina